Yeni Şərif (also, Sharif and Sharifoba) is a village and municipality in the Balakan Rayon of Azerbaijan.  It has a population of 3,086.

References 

Populated places in Balakan District